Lenzia may refer to:
 Lenzia (plant), a genus of plants in the family Montiaceae
 Lenzia (brachiopod), a fossil genus of brachiopods in the family Delthyrididae
 Lenzia, a genus of arachnids in the family Winterschmidtiidae, synonym of Calvolia